Herrick is a rural locality in the local government area of Dorset in the North-east region of Tasmania. The 2016 census determined a population of 52 for the state suburb of Herrick.

History
Herrick was gazetted as a locality in 1969.

Geography
The Ringarooma River forms the south-eastern boundary.

Road infrastructure
The Tasman Highway (A3) briefly passes through the southern extremity. Route B82 (Gladstone Road) starts at an intersection with A3  and runs north and east before exiting. Route C839 (Racecourse Road) passes through from west to east.

References

Localities of Dorset Council (Australia)
Towns in Tasmania